Nick Courtney (born November 30, 1987) is an American soccer player who plays as a defender for New York Athletic Club in the National Premier Soccer League.

Career

College & Amateur
Courtney played four years of college soccer at Wake Forest University between 2006 and 2009.

Professional career
Courtney signed with USL Pro club Charlotte Eagles during their 2012 season.

Courtney signed with National Premier Soccer League club New York Athletic Club during their 2014 season.

References

1987 births
Living people
American soccer players
Association football defenders
North Carolina Fusion U23 players
Charlotte Eagles players
Cosmopolitan Soccer League players
New York Athletic Club S.C. players
People from Grapevine, Texas
Soccer players from Texas
Sportspeople from the Dallas–Fort Worth metroplex
USL Championship players
USL League Two players
Wake Forest Demon Deacons men's soccer players